Our Lady of the Forest Church was a Roman Catholic church in Forest Row, a village in East Sussex in southern England.

The Roman Catholic Archdiocese of Southwark built the church in the 1950s.  When the Diocese of Arundel and Brighton was formed in 1965 from part of Southwark's territory, it assumed responsibility for the church.   It was registered for marriages in February 1959, but closed in 2009. The President of the United States, John F. Kennedy, attended mass at the church in 1963.

The church closed after mass on Christmas Day in 2009. The church had a regular congregation of 50 and 90 at the time of its closure. The primary reason for the closure of the church was a shortage of priests; retired priests were conducting services at the church in the absence of the parish priest, Fr Steven Purnell.

Following the closure of the church the fittings and vestments were moved to the parish of the Immaculate Heart of Mary in Kwadaso-Kumasi in the Archdiocese of Kumasi in northern Ghana.

The congregation is now part of Our Lady and St Peter's Church in nearby East Grinstead.

Kennedy visit
John F. Kennedy, the President of the United States, attended mass at the Church on 29 June 1963. Kennedy's attendance ensured that this was the first Roman Catholic Mass at which an American president had been present in England. Kennedy had been staying at Birch Grove, the family residence of the British Prime Minister Harold Macmillan during his only official visit to the United Kingdom. Kennedy travelled to the church in a large motorcade of police and Secret Service agents. Crowds were present along the route as well as campaigners for nuclear disarmament. Kennedy and Macmillan had been discussing what would eventually become the Partial Nuclear Test Ban Treaty at Birch Grove.

The parish priest, Fr Charles P. Dolman, omitted his typical 15-minute sermon due to constraints on Kennedy's time, but expressed gratitude that "one of the world's leading Catholics should be with us in our little wayside chapel this morning". Kennedy shook hands with villagers outside the church as he left after the mass.

Kennedy was accompanied by Philip de Zulueta, a fellow Roman Catholic and private secretary to MacMillan. On his way to and from the church Kennedy's sole topic of conversation was sexual gossip connected to the Profumo affair, much to Zulueta's astonishment; MacMillan was shocked by reports of Kennedy's conversations.

Kennedy was assassinated in November, just under six months following his visit to Sussex; MacMillan subsequently unveiled a memorial plaque to Kennedy at Forest Row Village Hall. Kennedy's visit to the church was commemorated by a small plaque; a memorial mass was subsequently held on the anniversary of his visit for several years.

See also
List of former places of worship in Wealden

References

External links
JFK Library - Images of Kennedy at Our Lady of the Forest
Archive news footage of Kennedy at Forest Row

Former churches in East Sussex
Roman Catholic churches completed in the 1950s
2009 disestablishments in England
Our Lady of the Forest Church